Roberto Cingolani (born 23 December 1961) is an Italian physicist, academic and manager who served as minister for ecological transition in the cabinet of Prime Minister Mario Draghi from 2021 to 2022.

Early life and education
Cingolani spent his childhood in Bari where he graduated from the University of Bari in 1985 with a degree in physics. He obtained his doctorate there in November 1988, and his PhD at the Scuola Normale Superiore in Pisa in 1990.

Academic career
From 1988 to 1991, Cingolani was a staff member of the Max Planck Institute in Stuttgart, Germany, under the direction of Nobel laureate Klaus von Klitzing. He planned to move permanently to Japan to work at the University of Tokyo, but returned to Italy due to the death of his father.

From 1991 to 1999, Cingolani was first researcher and then associate professor of general physics at the Materials Science Department of the University of Salento (then called the University of Lecce). Between 1997 and 2000, he was a visiting professor at the University of Tokyo, then at Virginia Commonwealth University in the United States. From 2000 to 2005 he returned to the University of Salento, where he was professor of general physics at the Faculty of Engineering. There, he founded and directed the National Laboratory of Nanotechnologies in Lecce.

In 2001, Cingolani worked as an expert for the Public Prosecutor's Office of Rome giving expert opinions on the Marta Russo and Unabomber cases.

From 2005 to 2019, Cingolani was scientific director of the Italian Institute of Technology (IIT) in Genoa. In December 2015, he was awarded the Rome Science Prize. In 2016 he worked on the birth of the Human Technopole in Milan, the project for a citadel of life science.

Career in the private sector
From 2019 until 2021, Cingolani was the technology and innovation officer at Leonardo S.p.A.; before this, he was scientific director at the Istituto Italiano di Tecnologia in Genoa from 2005 to 2019. In April 2019 he joined the board of directors of Illycaffè. In April 2020 he was appointed non-executive director on Ferrari's board of directors. He resigned from the board of directors of Ferrari on 16 February 2021.

Political career
On 13 February 2021, Cingolani was appointed minister for ecological transition in the Draghi cabinet. The newly created role took over energy matters previously shared with other ministries and combined them with the environment portfolio. He has criticized environmental activists for being too ideological in their approach and called for a slower, sustainable transition. Italian climate activists have expressed concern over Cingolani's calls for a slower transition and his statements supporting increased use of natural gas.

Together with Foreign Minister Luigi Di Maio, Cingolani appointed senior diplomat Alessandro Modiano as Italy's first-ever special envoy for climate change in January 2022.

Since leaving government office, Cingolani has been informally advising Prime Minister Giorgia Meloni on energy policy.

Other activities
 De Nora, Member of the Board of Directors (since 2023)

References

External links

1961 births
Living people
20th-century Italian physicists
21st-century Italian physicists
University of Bari alumni
Academic staff of the University of Salento
Draghi Cabinet
Environment ministers of Italy
Independent politicians in Italy